William Edward Osborne Williams (15 December 1866 – 22 June 1945) was a Welsh international rugby union forward who played club rugby for Cardiff and London Welsh. Williams was capped for Wales five times over a period of four years.

Rugby career
Williams was educated at St John's School, Leatherhead.  He first came to prominence as a rugby player while representing Cardiff, a team he captained after Charlie Arthur.  Williams was first selected for the Welsh national rugby team in a game against Scotland as part of the 1887 Home Nations Championship. Williams was one of three new Welsh caps chosen for the match, along with half-back George Bowen and full-back Hugh Hughes. The game was a one-sided affair with Scotland scoring 12 tries without reply. Despite the crushing defeat the selectors kept faith with the squad, making few changes. Williams was reselected for the next game of the Championship, played at Birkenhead, which Wales won, mainly thanks to a drop goal from Arthur 'Monkey' Gould.

Williams didn't play during the 1888 Championship, but played one game during the 1889 tournament. Under the captaincy of Frank Hill, Williams found himself part of another away loss to Scotland, but this time was not in the squad that faced Ireland in the last game of the Championship. Williams played two more games for the Wales team, both in the 1890 Home Nations Championship. The opening game of the tournament saw Wales lose to Scotland, but Williams' last international match was a historic first win for the Welsh team over England. Williams may well have played in more international games, but while playing for Cardiff in an encounter against Newport in November 1890, Williams sustained a serious injury which ending his rugby career. Williams had only just be given the captaincy of Cardiff, and his vice-captain, D.W. Evans was promoted to captain after Williams' retirement.

International games played
Wales
  1890
  1887
  1887, 1889, 1890

Bibliography

References

1866 births
1945 deaths
Welsh rugby union players
Rugby union forwards
Cardiff RFC players
Wales international rugby union players
London Welsh RFC players
People educated at St John's School, Leatherhead